The Society for Elementary Books (Polish: Towarzystwo do Ksiąg Elementarnych; 1775–92) was an institution formed by Poland's Commission of National Education (Komisja Edukacji Narodowej) in Warsaw in 1775. The Society's mandate was to design school syllabuses and textbooks for newly reformed schools.

History
Since education in Poland had until then been conducted mostly in Latin, the Commission of National Education faced the problem of an almost complete lack of textbooks. It was to cope with this problem that the Society for Elementary Books was formed. At times the scientists who worked on the new Polish-language textbooks had to invent the requisite specialized vocabulary. Much of the vocabulary that they invented, related to chemistry, physics, mathematics and grammar, is still in use today, and some of the Society's textbooks were in use as late as the Second Polish Republic (1918–39)

The chairman of the Society for Elementary Books, in the years 1775-1791 was Ignacy Potocki, and in 1792 Julian Ursyn Niemcewicz. The main secretary, in the years 1775-1787, was Grzegorz Piramowicz, later Franciszek Zabłocki. Significant contributions to the Society's activities were put by Hugo Kołłątaj. The ordinary members of the Society were also: John the Baptist Albertrandi, Józef Bogucicki, Paweł Czempiński, Jędrzej Gawroński, Szymon L'Huillier, Szczepan Hołowczyc, Adam Jakukiewicz, Grzegorz Kniażewicz, Józef Koblański Onufry Kopczyński, Feliks Łojko, Kazimierz Narbutt, Antoni Popławski, Stefan Roussel, Sebastian Sierakowski, Józef Wybicki and scientific directors in Corps of Cadets (Warsaw) - Christian Pfleiderer (German professor of mathematics) and Michał Jan Hube. The honorary members of the Society were: Jan Dubois de Jancigny, Piotr Samuel Dupont de Nemours and Scipione Piattoli

Famous books created by the Society included Elementarz dla szkół parafialnych and Gramatyka dla szkół narodowych z przypisami. The Society was chaired by Ignacy Potocki, and its general secretary was Grzegorz Piramowicz. Hugo Kołłątaj made many important contributions to the Society's projects. Members included Onufry Kopczyński, Kazimierz Narbutt, Józef Wybicki and the academic directors of the Warsaw Corps of Cadets—Ch. Pfleiderer (mathematics) and Michał Jan Hube.

The Society was dissolved in 1792, in anticipation of the coming total dissolution of the Polish state.

References

Bibliography
  T. Wierzbowski: Komisja Edukacji Narodowej 1773-1794. Monografia historyczna, t. 1: A. Opracowania i źródła drukowane, B. Źródła archiwalne, Warszawa 1911.
 A. Jobert: La Commission d'Éducation Nationale en Polgne (1773-1794). Son oeuvre d'instruction civique, Paryż 1941, s. 1-24.

1775 establishments in the Polish–Lithuanian Commonwealth
1792 disestablishments in Europe
Educational organisations based in Poland
History of education in Poland
1790s disestablishments in the Polish–Lithuanian Commonwealth
Science and technology in Poland